This list of botanical gardens and arboretums in Washington, D.C. is intended to include all significant botanical gardens and arboretums in the U.S.  District of Columbia

See also
List of botanical gardens and arboretums in the United States

References 

 
Arboreta in Washington, D.C.
botanical gardens and arboretums in Washington, D.C.